Robert Dalban (born Gaston Barré; 19 July 1903, in Celles-sur-Belle, Deux-Sèvres – 3 April 1987, in Paris) was a  French actor. His work included stage acting, roles in TV shows and dubbing American stars. Moreover, he was a fixture in French cinema for many decades.

Selected filmography 

1934: Gold in the Street (by Curtis Bernhardt) - L'homme à la gare (uncredited)
1937: Passeurs d'hommes
1939: Deuxième bureau contre Kommandantur (by René Jayet et Robert Bibal) - Un officier allemand

1945: Boule de suif by Christian-Jaque : Prussian man called Oskar
1945: The Last Judgment 
1947: Quai des Orfèvres by Henri-Georges Clouzot : car thief Paulo 
1947: Les jeux sont faits by Jean Delannoy : Georges'
1949: Berlin Express by Jacques Tourneur : chief of the French secret service'
1949: Manon by Henri-Georges Clouzot : hotel keeper
1949: The Walls of Malapaga by René Clément : mariner
1950: A Man Walks in the City by Marcello Pagliero: Laurent
1951: The Passerby by Henri Calef : smuggler
1952: They Were Five by Jack Pinoteau : manager
1952: The Seven Deadly Sins by Georges Lacombe : the showman in : „The Eighth Sin“
1952: La Minute de vérité by Jean Delannoy : Mr Taboureau
 1953: Their Last Night
1954: Service Entrance by Carlo Rim: Jules' friend
1954: Obsession by Jean Delannoy : inspector Chardin
1954: Destinées by Jean Delannoy : D'Aulon in :  "The miracle of Jeanne d'Arc"
1955: Les Diaboliques by Henri-Georges Clouzot : the mechanic
1956: Les Truands by Carlo Rim : Pepito Benoît
1956: La Loi des rues by Ralph Habib : trucker
1956: The Lebanese Mission by Richard Pottier : Malek
1956: Le Chanteur de Mexico by Richard Pottier  : employé of the theatre 
1956: Maid in Paris by Pierre Gaspard-Huit
1956: I'll Get Back to Kandara'
1957: The River of Three Junks 
1957: La Tour, prends garde ! by Georges Lampin : Barberin
1957: Les Espions by Henri-Georges Clouzot
1958: Marie-Octobre by Julien Duvivier : Léon Blanchet, the locksmith
1959: Pourquoi viens-tu si tard? by Henri Decoin : street hawker
1960: Boulevard by Julien Duvivier : street hawker
1961: Please, Not Now! by Roger Vadim
1961: Le Miracle des loups by André Hunebelle : the courier
1962: Madame Sans-Gêne by Christian-Jaque : instructor
1962: The Mysteries of Paris d'André Hunebelle : inn keeper
1963: Vice and Virtue by Roger Vadim : German officer
1963: Les Tontons flingueurs by Georges Lautner : Jean
1963: Hardi Pardaillan! by Bernard Borderie
1964: Fantômas by André Hunebelle : editor-in-chief
1965: Man from Cocody by Christian-Jaque : Pépé
1965: Trap for Cinderella by André Cayatte  : Bayen, mechanic
1965: Fantômas se déchaîne by André Hunebelle  : editor-in-chief
1966: Fantômas contre Scotland Yard by André Hunebelle : editor-in-chief
1966: The Big Restaurant (by Jacques Besnard) - the French conspirator
1969: Mon oncle Benjamin (by Edouard Molinaro) - Jean-François, inn keeper
1969: The Brain by Gérard Oury : Belgian soldier
1970: Le Distrait by Pierre Richard : Mazelin
1971: Les Malheurs d'Alfred by Pierre Richard : Gustave, the driver
1972: The Tall Blond Man with One Black Shoe by Yves Robert : the florist
1973: Comment réussir quand on est con et pleurnichard by Michel Audiard : Léonce, bistrot keeper
1973: Hail the Artist by Yves Robert : concierge
1973: Now Where Did the 7th Company Get to? by Robert Lamoureux : the peasant
1974: Comme un pot de fraises by Jean Aurel : salesman
1975: Incorrigible by Philippe de Broca : Freddy
1975: Only the Wind Knows the Answer1976: Dracula and Son by Edouard Molinaro : concierge
1978: Coup de tête by Jean-Jacques Annaud : Jeanjean
1980: The Umbrella Coup by Gérard Oury : Jean-Robert
1980: La Boum by Claude Pinoteau : Serge, the waiter
1981: La Chèvre by Francis Veber : the locksmith
1982: Les Misérables by Robert Hossein : the coachman
1982: La Boum 2 by Claude Pinoteau : Serge, the waiter
1983: Les Compères by Francis Veber : the concierge
1984: P'tit Con'' by Gérard Lauzier : the concierge

Voice actors:

Jack (Jack's Big Music Show) 

David (The Upside Down Show)

External links 
 

1903 births
1987 deaths
French male film actors
French male voice actors
20th-century French male actors
People from Deux-Sèvres